Wangberg or Wängberg is a surname. Notable people with the surname include:

Birgitta Wängberg (born 1939), Swedish freestyle swimmer
Edvard Wangberg (1913–1983), Norwegian speed skater
Lou Wangberg (born 1941), American educator and politician
Simen Wangberg (born 1991), Norwegian footballer